Lupin most often refers to:
 Lupinus, a genus of plants in the legume family
 Lupin bean, used as food

Lupin may also refer to:

Arts and entertainment
 Lúpin, a comic book from Argentina
 Lupin the Third, a Japanese manga series by Monkey Punch and the subsequent media franchise
 Lupin (Philippine TV series), a 2007 Philippine television drama action series
 Lupin (EP), a 2010 EP and title song by South Korean girl group Kara
 Lupin (French TV series), a 2021 Netflix television series starring Omar Sy

Fictional characters
 Arsène Lupin, gentleman thief turned detective extraordinaire in novels by Maurice Leblanc
 Arsène Lupin III, in the Lupin III media franchise
 Remus Lupin, member of the Order of the Phoenix in the Harry Potter series
 Paul Toledo "Lupin", a commando in Commandos 2: Men of Courage video game
 Lupin Pooter, the son of the protagonist, in the 1892 novel The Diary of a Nobody by George and Weedon Grossmith

Other
 Lupin Limited, an Indian multinational pharmaceutical company
 Lupin Mine, a gold mine in Nunavut, Canada
 Fort Lupin, an artillery battery in Charente-Maritime, France

See also
Arsène Lupin (disambiguation)